The Broncos–Seahawks rivalry is an American football rivalry in the National Football League (NFL) between the Denver Broncos and the Seattle Seahawks. The teams were AFC West divisional rivals from 1977 until 2001, after which the Seahawks moved to the NFC West. The Broncos lead the series 35–22. The teams have met twice in the playoffs, most notably the 43–8 Seahawks victory in Super Bowl XLVIII.

Notable Events

1983 AFC wild card game

Seattle's first post-season appearance came in 1983, with the Denver Broncos as their opponent in the AFC Wild Card game. They met on Christmas Eve at the Kingdome, where the Seahawks won 31–7 and notched their first playoff victory.

Bosworth / Elway feud
Outspoken linebacker Brian Bosworth was selected by the Seahawks in the 1987 NFL Draft. "The Boz" spent the weeks leading up to his first game, a week-one matchup at Denver, trash-talking the Broncos and their star quarterback John Elway. Bosworth's quote "I can’t wait to get my hands on John Elway’s boyish face" riled up the Denver fanbase, as did his nickname of "Mr. Ed" for the QB. After losing the game, the industrious Bosworth claimed that the anti-Boz t-shirts that many Denver fans wore to the game were secretly produced and sold by his own company. When Bosworth was waived by the Seahawks in 1990, Elway shed no tears and predicted the linebacker's nascent acting career would be a flop.

Harden / Largent hits

In Week 1 of the 1988 season, future NFL Hall of Fame Seahawks wide receiver Steve Largent was knocked out cold by Denver safety Mike Harden. Largent suffered a concussion and lost two teeth from the brutal forearm hit; no penalty was called on the field, but Harden was subsequently fined $5,000 by the league.

Later that season, Largent got revenge. In their Week 15 rematch Seahawks quarterback Dave Krieg was intercepted by Harden on an intended pass to Brian Blades. Largent followed the play out of the opposite corner of the endzone and put a huge blindside hit on Harden during the return. The hit knocked out the ball and Largent recovered the fumble himself. After Largent's payback, the original interception was nullified by a defensive holding penalty.

Super Bowl XLVIII

On February 2, 2014, the AFC Champion Denver Broncos met the NFC Champion Seattle Seahawks in Super Bowl XLVIII to decide the 2013 NFL season.

The Broncos had the best offense that season (Statistically the best offense of all time), and the Seahawks had the best defense of that season. 

This Super Bowl was a matchup between former AFC West adversaries, a fact that was immediately noticed by local media in the run-up to the big game. The postseason finale reignited the rivalry that had been mostly dormant for the past decade, the teams having met only 3 times since the Seahawks moved to the NFC West for the 2002 season.

On the first play of the game, the Seahawks recorded the fastest score of Super Bowl history, scoring a safety off a botched snap to Peyton Manning, 12 seconds into the first quarter. 

The Seahawk defense prevailed against the Bronco offense, as Seattle went on to beat Denver 43-8. 

By happenstance the teams immediately met again on August 7 in the 2014 NFL preseason, which was both teams' next game following the Super Bowl.

Russell Wilson trade
In 2022, Seattle traded franchise quarterback Russell Wilson to Denver after 10 years with the team. Wilson won Super Bowl XLVIII with the Seahawks, beating the Broncos 43–8. The Broncos would 
go on to finish last in the AFC West, going 5-12 in the 2022 NFL season. The Seahawks would finish 9-8, second in the NFC West and make the playoffs with Geno Smith as the starting quarterback of their team in the 2022 NFL Season. The Seahawks would end up losing to the 49ers 41-23 in the NFC Wild Card Game.

Game Results 

|-
| 
| style="| Broncos  24–13
| Kingdome
| Broncos  1–0
| Seahawks join NFL as an expansion team and are placed in the NFC West. The following season, they were moved to the AFC West, where they remained through . First meeting in Kingdome. Broncos lose Super Bowl XII.
|-
| rowspan=2| 
| style="| Broncos  28–7
| Mile High Stadium
| rowspan=2| Broncos  3–0
| First meeting in Mile High Stadium.
|-
| style="| Broncos  20–17 (OT)
| Kingdome
| 
|-
| rowspan=2| 
| style="| Broncos  37–34
| Mile High Stadium
| rowspan=2| Broncos  4–1
| 
|-
| style="| Seahawks  28–23
| Kingdome
| 
|-

|-
| 
| style="| 
| style="| Broncos  36–20
| style="| Broncos  25–17
| Broncos  6–1
| 
|-
| 
| Tie 1–1
| style="| Broncos  23–13
| style="| Seahawks  13–10
| Broncos  7–2
| 
|-
| 
| style="| 
| style="| Seahawks  17–10
| style="| Seahawks  13–11
| Broncos  7–4
| Both meetings were played despite the players' strike which reduced the season to 9 games; Seahawks first series sweep.
|-
| 
| Tie 1–1
| style="| Broncos  38–27
| style="| Seahawks  27–19
| Broncos  8–5
| 
|-
|- style="background:#f2f2f2; font-weight:bold;"
|  1983 Playoffs
| style="| 
| 
| style="| Seahawks  31–7
|  Broncos  8–6
|  1983 AFC Wild Card Game. First playoff meeting between the two franchises.
|-
| 
| Tie 1–1
| style="| Seahawks  27–24
| style="| Broncos  31–14
| Broncos  9–7
| Meeting in Seattle was a de facto AFC West Championship Game. Broncos win to clinch the division and finished as the #2 seed while forcing the Seahawks into the AFC Wild Card Game as the eventual #4 seed.
|-
| 
| style="| 
| style="| Broncos  13–10(OT)
| style="| Broncos  27–24
| Broncos  11–7
| 
|-
| 
| Tie 1–1
| style="| Broncos  20–13
| style="| Seahawks  47–13
| Broncos  12–8
| Broncos lose Super Bowl XXI.
|-
| 
| Tie 1–1
| style="| Broncos  40–17
| style="| Seahawks  28–21
| Broncos  13–9
| Broncos lose Super Bowl XXII.
|-
| 
| style="| 
| style="| Seahawks  21–14
| style="| Seahawks  42–14
| Broncos  13–11
| 
|-
| 
| style="| 
| style="| Broncos  41–14
| style="| Broncos  24–21(OT)
| Broncos  15–11
| Broncos lose Super Bowl XXIV.
|-

|-
| 
| Tie 1–1
| style="| Broncos  34–31(OT)
| style="| Seahawks  17–12
| Broncos  16–12
| 
|-
| 
| Tie 1–1
| style="| Broncos  16–10
| style="| Seahawks  13–10
| Broncos  17–13
| 
|-
| 
| Tie 1–1
| style="| Broncos  10–6
| style="| Seahawks  16–13(OT)
| Broncos  18–14
| 
|-
| 
| style="| 
| style="| Broncos  28–17
| style="| Broncos  17–9
| Broncos  20–14
| 
|-
| 
| style="| 
| style="| Broncos  17–10
| style="| Broncos  16–9
| Broncos  22–14
| Broncos win six straight meetings in Denver.
|-
| 
| style="| 
| style="| Seahawks  31–27
| style="| Seahawks  27–10
| Broncos  22–16
| Seahawks' first season sweep since 1988.
|-
| 
| style="| 
| style="| Broncos  34–7
| style="| Broncos  30–20
| Broncos  24–16
| 
|-
| 
| style="| 
| style="| Broncos  30–27
| style="| Broncos  35–14
| Broncos  26–16
| Broncos win Super Bowl XXXII.
|-
| 
| style="| 
| style="| Broncos  28–21
| style="| Broncos  21–16
| Broncos  28–16
| Broncos win Super Bowl XXXIII.
|-
| 
| Tie 1–1
| style="| Broncos  36–30(OT)
| style="| Seahawks  20–17
| Broncos  29–17
| Broncos win six straight meetings. Final meeting in Kingdome.
|-

|-
| rowspan=2| 
| style="| Broncos  31–24
| Mile High Stadium
| rowspan=2| Broncos  31–17
| Final meeting in Mile High Stadium
|-
| style="| Broncos  38–31
| Husky Stadium
| Seahawks temporarily play at Husky Stadium during demolition of the Kingdome.
|-
| rowspan=2| 
| style="| Broncos  20–7
| Empower Field at Mile High
| rowspan=2| Broncos  32–18
| Broncos open Broncos Stadium at Mile High (known then as "Invesco Field at Mile High").
|-
| style="| Seahawks  34–21
| Husky Stadium
| Final meeting in Husky Stadium.
|-
| 
| style="| Broncos  31–9
| Seahawks Stadium
| Broncos  33–18
| Seahawks move to the NFC West as a result of NFL realignment. Seahawks open Seahawks Stadium (now known as Lumen Field).
|-
| 
| style="| Seahawks  23–20
| Empower Field at Mile High
| Broncos  33–19
| Seahawks' first win over Broncos in Denver since 1995.
|-

|-
| 
| style="| Broncos  31–14
| Empower Field at Mile High
| Broncos  34–19
| 
|- style="font-weight:bold; background:#f2f2f2;"
| 2013 playoffs
| style="| Seahawks  43–8
| MetLife Stadium
| Broncos  34–20
| Super Bowl XLVIII. First meeting between Peyton Manning and Russell Wilson.
|-
| 
| style="| Seahawks  26–20(OT)
| CenturyLink Field
| Broncos  34–21
| Peyton Manning's final start in the series. Seahawks lose Super Bowl XLIX.
|-
| 
| style="| Broncos  27–24
| Empower Field at Mile High
| Broncos  35–21
| Russell Wilson's final start in the series for the Seahawks.
|-

|-
| 
| style="| Seahawks  17–16
| Lumen Field
| Broncos  35–22
| After 10 years with the Seahawks, Russell Wilson is traded to the Broncos. Wilson's first start as a Bronco.
|- 

|-
| Regular season
| style="|
| Broncos 22–5
| Seahawks 15–13
| 
|-
| Postseason
| style="|
| N/A
| Seahawks 1–0
| 1983 AFC Wild Card Game, Super Bowl XLVIII
|-
| Regular and postseason 
| style="|
| Broncos 22–5
| Seahawks 16–13
| Seahawks are 1–0 at neutral site games
|-

References 

Denver Broncos
Seattle Seahawks
National Football League rivalries
Denver Broncos rivalries
Seattle Seahawks rivalries